Henri Kontinen and Konstantin Kravchuk were the defending champions, but chose not to participate.
Andreas Beck and Jan Mertl won the title, defeating Rameez Junaid and Adil Shamasdin in the final, 6–2, 3–6, [10–3].

Seeds

Draw

References
 Main Draw

Challenger La Manche - Doubles